Guillermo Frez (19 November 1898 – 19 February 1965) was a Chilean footballer. He played in one match for the Chile national football team in 1919. He was also part of Chile's squad for the 1919 South American Championship.

References

External links
 
 

1898 births
1965 deaths
Chilean footballers
Chile international footballers
Place of birth missing
Association football forwards